The following lists events that happened in 1915 in El Salvador.

Incumbents
President: Alfonso Quiñónez Molina (until 1 March), Carlos Meléndez Ramírez (starting 1 March)
Vice President: Carlos Meléndez Ramírez (until 1 March), Alfonso Quiñónez Molina (starting 1 March)

Events

January
 12 January – Voters in El Salvador elected National Democratic Party candidate Carlos Meléndez Ramirez as President by a margin of 100%, but no results were published and he ran unopposed.

March
 1 March – Carlos Meléndez Ramírez was sworn in as President of El Salvador. Alfonso Quiñónez Molina was sworn in as Vice President.

May
 10 May – La Prensa Gráfica, a Salvadoran newspaper, began publication.

References

 
El Salvador
1910s in El Salvador
Years of the 20th century in El Salvador
El Salvador